Histone H4 transcription factor is a protein that in humans is encoded by the HINFP gene.

Function 

HINFP is a protein that binds to a highly conserved DNA motif found in most histone H4 genes. HINFP activates H4 gene expression through interactions with the CDK2 substrate NPAT which is localized in Histone Locus Bodies. HINFP was independently described as a protein called "MBD2 interacting zinc finger protein" (MIZF). MIZF was reported to interact with methyl-CpG-binding protein-2 (MBD2; MIM 603547), a component of the MeCP1 histone deacetylase (HDAC) complex. MIZF is thought to play a role in DNA methylation and transcription repression.[supplied by OMIM]

Interactions 

One key partner protein of HINFP is NPAT, a CDK2 substrate that localizes to Histone Locus Bodies. MIZF has been reported to interact with Methyl-CpG-binding domain protein 2 and DHX9.

References

Further reading